The Te Kapa River is on the Mahurangi Peninsula in the Auckland Region of New Zealand's North Island. It runs into the Mahurangi Harbour.

See also
List of rivers of New Zealand

References

External links
Photograph of Te Kapa River held in Auckland Libraries' heritage collections.

Rivers of the Auckland Region
Rivers of New Zealand
Hauraki Gulf catchment